Roger Carcassonne-Leduc (12 January 1911 in Marnia – 10 December 1991 in Paris, France) was a member of the French Resistance.

A French industrialist in Oran, he served as a second lieutenant with the 8th Regiment. Sent to Tunisia, at the time of the armistice he appeared in front of the military justice for having posted and distributed the texts of the call of June 18 from General Charles de Gaulle.

Foundation of Oran Resistance 
Transferred with his unit to Oran, Carcassonne was demobilized on 28 August 1940 and sought immediately, with his brother Pierre Carcassonne, to go to England via Gibraltar. But this was in vain, because the Vichy police and naval services guarded well and, the denouncement helping, more severe judgments rained down on those who were captured. 

He then organized, with the help of his brother Pierre and some friends, including Captain Louis Jobelot, a group which was devoted to producing discrete propaganda and tried to gather everyone possible.

In March 1941, in Oran, Captain Jobelot introduced Henri d'Astier de la Vigerie to him, an officer at the Second Bureau of the Armistice Army, with whom he immediately sympathized. After some interviews, the two men decided to create a movement, and intended to gather all those who wanted to fight against the Germans.

Co-operation with the Algiers resistance 
Roger and Pierre Carcassonne continued to develop the recruitment and the coordination of the forces and intelligence agents. 

In August 1941, in Algiers, Carcassonne met his cousin José Aboulker, a medical student, who had also begun resistance in September 1940. The two men decided to keep up to date with their activities, however, without combining their respective organizations.

Carcassonne in Oran, under the pseudonym of Leduc, and Aboulker in Algiers, continued their activities which were centred on the construction of armed groups and military and civilian information centres. They did not engage propaganda, considering it to have little effect but likely to draw attention of their opponents.

In 1942, Carcassonne sent his brother in Algiers to introduce Jose Aboulker to Henri d'Astier of Vigerie. He also dealt with the expenses of the Oran group and financed the organization of the resistance for all North Africa.

References 

People from Oran
People from Tlemcen
French military personnel of World War II
French Resistance members
1911 births
1991 deaths
People of French Algeria